Ishige (written: 石毛) is a Japanese surname. Notable people with the surname include:

, Japanese footballer
, Japanese baseball player
, Japanese voice actress
, Japanese voice actor
, Japanese sport shooter

Japanese-language surnames